Ryszard Marcin Wolny (born 24 March 1969 in Racibórz) is a Polish wrestler and Olympic champion in Greco-Roman wrestling.

Olympics
Wolny has competed in five Olympics, from 1988 to 2004. At the 1996 Summer Olympics in Atlanta where he received a gold medal in Greco-Roman wrestling, the lightweight class.

References

External links
 

1969 births
Living people
Olympic wrestlers of Poland
Wrestlers at the 1988 Summer Olympics
Wrestlers at the 1992 Summer Olympics
Wrestlers at the 1996 Summer Olympics
Wrestlers at the 2000 Summer Olympics
Wrestlers at the 2004 Summer Olympics
Polish male sport wrestlers
Olympic gold medalists for Poland
Olympic medalists in wrestling
People from Racibórz
Sportspeople from Silesian Voivodeship
Medalists at the 1996 Summer Olympics
European Wrestling Championships medalists
World Wrestling Championships medalists
20th-century Polish people
21st-century Polish people